ERCC may refer to:

 East Riding County Council, Yorkshire, England
 
 European Rugby Champions Cup, Europe's top rugby union club competition
 European Rugby Challenge Cup, the second tier competition
 Evangelical Reformed Church of Christ, Nigeria
 Excision repair cross-complementing, including a list of ERCC genes
 External RNA Controls Consortium, see Epitranscriptomic sequencing